Ararat International Airlines was an airline headquartered in Yerevan, Armenia and based at the city's Zvartnots International Airport. The company (the name of which is derived from Mount Ararat) was founded in 2010.

Fleet
In January 2013, the Ararat International Airlines fleet consisting of one McDonnell Douglas MD-82, was leased out to Kish Air.

References

External links

Defunct airlines of Armenia
Airlines established in 2010
Airlines disestablished in 2013
Transport in Yerevan
Armenian companies established in 2010
2013 disestablishments in Armenia